Alexis Revé Avilés (born 17 November 1972) is a Cuban retired footballer.

Club career
He played his entire career for local provincial side Villa Clara.

International career
Revé played at the 1989 FIFA U-16 World Championship and made his senior international debut for Cuba in a December 1996 World Cup qualification match against Panama. He has earned a total of 12 caps, scoring no goals and has mostly been second choice to the evergreen Odelín Molina between the Cuban sticks. He represented his country at 4 CONCACAF Gold Cup final tournaments.

His final international was a July 2005 CONCACAF Gold Cup match against Canada.

References

External links
 

1972 births
Living people
Association football goalkeepers
Cuban footballers
Cuba international footballers
1998 CONCACAF Gold Cup players
2002 CONCACAF Gold Cup players
2003 CONCACAF Gold Cup players
2005 CONCACAF Gold Cup players
FC Villa Clara players
20th-century Cuban people